The New Zealand women's Under-17 Football Team, informally known as the 'Young Football Ferns', is the representative team for New Zealand in international Under-17 association football tournaments. The Young Football Ferns were the host team for the 2008 FIFA U-17 Women's World Cup.

The Young Football Ferns compete in the OFC U-17 Women's Championship, the bi-annual confederation championship to decide who represents Oceania Football Confederation at the FIFA U-17 Women's World Cup.  The inaugural tournament was held in 2010.

FIFA U-17 Women's World Cup Finals history 
Legend

2008

2010

2012

2014

2016

2018

2022

Players

Current squad
Squad for the 2022 FIFA U-17 Women's World Cup.

Competitive record

FIFA U-17 Women's World Cup

OFC U-17 Women's Championship
The OFC Under 17 Women's Championship is a tournament held once every two years to decide the only two qualification spots for the Oceania Football Confederation (OFC) and its representatives at the FIFA U-17 Women's World Cup. Since 2017 it has been renamed as the OFC U-16 Women's Championship and held in the year preceding the U-17 World Cup.

References

External links
NZ Football page
Ultimate NZ Soccer page
U-17 Women's World Cup page

Under17
Women's national under-17 association football teams
Oceanian women's national under-17 association football team